Galpin may refer to:
Galpin Auto Sports, automobile manufacturer.
Galpin Lake, a lake in Minnesota, United States
Galpin Society, a music organization

People with the surname Galpin
Alastair Galpin, South African record holder
Alfred Galpin, American composer
Barbara Galpin (1855–1922), American journalist
Ernest Edward Galpin, South African botanist and banker
Francis William Galpin (1858–1945), English cleric and musicologist
Homer Galpin (1871–1941), American lawyer and politician
John Galpin, English cricketer
Max Galpin (born 1935), Australian rules footballer 
Shannon Galpin, American trainer
Ted Galpin, British newspaper editor